Bodgate is a farmstead in east Cornwall, England, United Kingdom. The parish was transferred from Devon to Cornwall in 1966.

The settlement was recorded as "Bodgat" in 1286, and the name may have Saxon origins.

It has long been held by the Hawke family. A 1618 transfer of land rights to a Nicholas Hawke refers to the "mansion house, barton and demesnes called Bodgate in North Petherwin" Tithe apportionments produced under the Tithe Commutation Act 1836 show the estate consisted of 326 acres c1840, held by a Richard Hawke.

Both the 19th century Bodgate farmhouse, and the nearby c. 17th century stable block are Grade II listed buildings.

See also

 List of farms in Cornwall

References

Farms in Cornwall
Grade II listed agricultural buildings
Grade II listed buildings in Cornwall